This list of World War I flying aces from Austria contains the names of aces born in the territory of the modern-day Republic of Austria, which formed part of the Austro-Hungarian Empire. Austria-Hungary was a constitutional union of the Austrian Empire (Cisleithania) and the Kingdom of Hungary (Transleithania) which  existed from 1867 to 1918, when it collapsed as a result of defeat in World War I.

See also
 List of World War I flying aces
 List of World War I flying aces from the Austro-Hungarian Empire
 List of World War I flying aces from Croatia
 List of World War I flying aces from Hungary

Endnotes

Reference
 Franks, Norman; Guest, Russel; Alegi, Gregory (1997). Above the War Fronts: The British Two-seater Bomber Pilot and Observer Aces, the British Two-seater Fighter Observer Aces, and the Belgian, Italian, Austro-Hungarian and Russian Fighter Aces, 1914-1918: Volume 4 of Fighting Airmen of WWI Series: Volume 4 of Air Aces of WWI. Grub Street. , .

Austria
World War I ace
Ace